Hong Kyung-suk (or  ; born October 14, 1984) is a South Korean football coach and former player who is currently the coach for the Bhutanese women's national football team. He had been playing the WK-League side Daekyo Kangaroos in South Korea.

International goals

Honours

Korea Republic
 Women's East Asian Cup Winner : 2005

References

1984 births
Living people
South Korean women's footballers
South Korea women's international footballers
WK League players
Women's association football midfielders
Women's association football defenders
Asian Games medalists in football
Footballers at the 2002 Asian Games
Footballers at the 2006 Asian Games
Footballers at the 2010 Asian Games
Asian Games bronze medalists for South Korea
Medalists at the 2010 Asian Games
2003 FIFA Women's World Cup players